The LNWR Dreadnought class was a class of 40 passenger three-cylinder compound 2-2-2-0 locomotives designed by F. W. Webb for the London and North Western Railway, and manufactured by them in their Crewe Works between 1884 and 1888.  The railway also commissioned the Beyer, Peacock and Company to construct an additional locomotive of the design for the Pennsylvania Railroad.

Design
As the two pairs of driving wheels were not connected, the locomotives were "duplex drive" or "double-singles".

They were a development of Webb's Experiment class; they had larger boilers and smaller driving wheels, and while the Joy valve gear for the HP and LP cylinders could still be independently adjusted, it was now also possible to reverse both sets simultaneously.  The inside valve gear was subsequently amended to the loose or slip-eccentric system, thus giving automatic reversal.

Decline
When George Whale become chief mechanical engineer of the LNWR in 1903, he started a programme of eliminating Webb's over-complicated duplex compound locomotives. Consequently, the class was scrapped between December 1903, and  July 1905, having been replaced by Whale's Experiment class.

References

 Morandière, Jules (1885). "Locomotive compound de M. Webb, modèle de 1884 pour trains rapides et lourds", Revue Générale des Chemins de fer et des Tramways, VII. Dunod éditeur, pp.75-79, fig. VI.

Dreadnought
2-2-2-0 locomotives
Railway locomotives introduced in 1884
Compound locomotives
Standard gauge steam locomotives of Great Britain
Duplex locomotives